The Women's Marathon at the 2006 European Athletics Championships was held at the Ullevi on August 12.

Medalists

Schedule

Final ranking

Italy won European Marathon Cup

See also
 2006 European Marathon Cup

References

External links
 Results
 marathonspiegel

Marathon
Marathons at the European Athletics Championships
European Athletics Championships
Women's marathons
2006 in women's athletics
Marathons in Sweden